Horama pretus is a moth of the subfamily Arctiinae. It was described by Pieter Cramer in 1777. It is found on the West Indies and in Venezuela.

Adults are thought to be a Müllerian mimic of Polister major.

The larvae feed on Cassinae xylocarpa.

References

 

Euchromiina
Moths described in 1777